Bucur may refer to:

 Bucur (legendary shepherd), the legendary founder of Romania's capital, București (Bucharest)
 Bucur (surname)
 Bârsa lui Bucur River, a tributary of the Bârsa River in Romania
 Bucur River, a river in northwestern Romania
 Bucur Church, a church which formerly served as the chapel for the Radu Voda Monastery in Bucharest